Dublin County Mid was a parliamentary constituency represented in Dáil Éireann, the lower house of the Irish parliament or Oireachtas from 1977 to 1981. The constituency elected 3 deputies (Teachtaí Dála, commonly known as TDs) to the Dáil, using proportional representation by means of the single transferable vote (PR-STV).

History 
The constituency was created under the terms of the Electoral (Amendment) Act 1974 as part of the redistribution of constituencies which attempted to secure the re-election of the outgoing Fine Gael–Labour Party government. It drew its electorate from the existing Dublin County North and Dublin County South constituencies.

It was abolished by the Electoral (Amendment) Act 1980 and divided between the constituencies of Dublin South, Dublin South-West and Dublin South-Central. It was only used for the 1977 general election to the 21st Dáil.

Boundaries
The constituency covered the Rathfarnham, Terenure and Tallaght areas of County Dublin, as well as Blessington and other areas of northern County Wicklow. In the Electoral (Amendment) Act 1974, the boundaries of Dublin County Mid are given as:

In the administrative county of Dublin, the district electoral divisions of:
Rathfarnham Number One, Rathfarnham Number Two, Tallaght Number One, Tallaght Number Two, Tallaght Number Three, Terenure Number Two, Terenure Number Three, Terenure Number Four, Whitechurch;
and, in the administrative county of Wicklow, the district electoral divisions of:
Blessington, Burgage Kilbride, Lackan, in the former Rural District of Baltinglass No. 1;
and the following wards in the county borough of Dublin:
Rathfarnham B, Rathfarnham C, Rathfarnham D, Rathfarnham South.

TDs

1977 general election

See also 
Dáil constituencies
Politics of the Republic of Ireland
Historic Dáil constituencies
Elections in the Republic of Ireland

References

External links 
Oireachtas Members Database

Dáil constituencies in County Dublin (historic)
1977 establishments in Ireland
1981 disestablishments in Ireland
Constituencies established in 1977
Constituencies disestablished in 1981